Paramontana modesta is a species of sea snail, a marine gastropod mollusk in the family Raphitomidae.

This species has also been considered a synonym of Pseudodaphnella pullula Hervier, R.P.J., 1897

Description
(Original description) The fusiformly turreted, shell is solid and fulvous brown. The 5½ whorls are convex, stoutly and distantly longitudinally ribbed, and crossed with prominent erect ridges becoming sharply nodulous at the intersection. The spire is sharp. The aperture is narrowly ovate. The outer lip is somewhat flattened and thickened, strongly dentate within. The columella is a little sinuous, with a few small granulations at the base of the whorl. The posterior sinus is rather broad.

As is frequently the case in this genus, this species has a light and a dark colour dimorphism. A brown specimen in the British Museum, presented by G. F. Angas, is marked there as the type.

Distribution
This marine species is endemic to Australia and occurs off New South Wales, South Australia and Victoria.

References

 Verco, J.C. 1909. Notes on South Australian marine Mollusca with descriptions of new species. Part XII. Transactions of the Royal Society of South Australia 33: 293–342 
 Laseron, C. 1954. Revision of the New South Wales Turridae (Mollusca). Australian Zoological Handbook. Sydney : Royal Zoological Society of New South Wales pp. 56, pls 1–12
 Powell, A.W.B. 1966. The molluscan families Speightiidae and Turridae, an evaluation of the valid taxa, both Recent and fossil, with list of characteristic species. Bulletin of the Auckland Institute and Museum. Auckland, New Zealand 5: 1–184, pls 1–23

External links
 

modesta
Gastropods described in 1877
Gastropods of Australia